A top hat is a tall hat worn primarily in the 19th and early 20th century.

Top hat, Top Hat, Tophat or Top-hat may also refer to:

 Top Hat, a 1935 film starring Fred Astaire and Ginger Rogers
 Top Hat (musical), a 2011 stage musical adapted from the 1935 film
 Top hat (lighting), a theatrical lighting device
 Top hat (roller coaster element)
 TopHat (telescope), a balloon-borne experiment to measure the cosmic microwave background
 Top Hat (TUGS), a recurring character in the children's television series TUGS
 Top Hat 25 (and later model Top Hat 27), an Australian-made sailing yacht
 Top-hat filter, a signal filtering technique
 Top-hat transform, an operator from mathematical morphology and digital image processing
 TopHat (bioinformatics),  a bioinformatic sequence analysis package tool 
 TOPHAT, cryptonym of Dmitri Polyakov (1921–1988), a Soviet general and a spy for the CIA
Tophat beam, a kind of laser beam
Operation Top Hat, a "local field exercise" conducted by the United States Army Chemical Corps in 1953
 Top hat, another name for a steel batten
 Top Hat, in automotive design, differing upper bodies sharing a common platform
 Top hat, a network of wires at the top of a mast radiator
 Top Hat, a character from The Tribe

Distinguish from

 Tophet